Ian Duncan Colvin (29 September 1877 – 10 May 1938) was a British journalist and historian (not to be confused with Ian Goodhope Colvin, his son, also a journalist and author). Of Scottish extraction, he was educated at Inverness College and the University of Edinburgh. Moving about the British Empire, he worked first on the staff of the Allahabad Pioneer (1900–03).  In voyage on the steamship Umona to his next position with the Cape Times, Colvin was shipwrecked on an atoll of the Maldives.  He joined a small group in a lifeboat which after nine days reached Colombo. He then proceeded to Cape Town (1903–07) where he wrote on the political and cultural scene in those formative years of the Union of South Africa. His research into the history of South Africa led to two volumes "South Africa" and "The Cape of Adventure".  In 1907 Colvin returned to the United Kingdom where he joined The Morning Post.

Between 1909 and 1937 he was the paper's leader-writer and wrote also under the pseudonym Rip Van Winkle, earning himself the title of 'keeper of the Tory conscience'. During this time he also wrote a series of amusing rhymed fables, several based on Aesop but reworked to fit contemporary politics. Originally published under the initials I.C., they were collected in 1914 and published under his own name with the title Aesop in Politics. Earlier collections of his satirical verses were Party Whips: by a Tory (1912) and Intercepted Letters (1913). In 1915 he published The Germans in England, 1066–1598, in which he claimed the Hanseatic League had tried to control Europe through a mixture of peaceful and violent means. He followed this with The unseen hand in English history (1917), which was designed "to show, by examining a segment of our history, from the reign of Elizabeth to the end of the eighteenth century, that England is most happy when the national interest and the government work together, and least happy when our government is controlled by the unseen hand of the foreigner". A departure from the polemical, political world was his slim volume of adaptations from Chinese poetry "After the Chinese" (1927).  Colvin called again on his knowledge of the legends of the Cape to write the libretto of an opera. "The Leper's Flute" (1926), the music for which was composed by Robert Ernest Bryson. 

In 1929 he published his biography of General Reginald Dyer. He also completed the three volumes on the life of the Irish Unionist leader Sir Edward Carson, the first volume being the work of Edward Marjoribanks.

Notes

External links

Ian Colvin's entry in the Oxford Dictionary of National Biography

1877 births
1938 deaths
British male journalists
British historians